Vinoj Suranjaya De Silva Muthumuni also simply known as Vinoj De Silva or Vinoj Suranjaya (born 9 January 1995) is a Sri Lankan track and field athlete and a national record holder in men's 200m.

Career 
He made his South Asian Games debut representing Sri Lanka at the 2016 South Asian Games and claimed two gold medals in 200m and  relay events. In 2018 during the national trials for the 2018 Asian Games, he broke the 200m national record after 20 years which was held by former athlete Sugath Thilakaratne, clocking 20.68 seconds. He also represented Sri Lanka at the 2018 Commonwealth Games.

Vinoj also claimed silver in men's 200m event and was also part of the team which claimed new South Asian Games record for the men's  relay event on 6 December 2019 during the 2019 South Asian Games.

References

External links 

 

1995 births
Living people
Sri Lankan male sprinters
Athletes (track and field) at the 2018 Commonwealth Games
Athletes (track and field) at the 2018 Asian Games
South Asian Games gold medalists for Sri Lanka
South Asian Games silver medalists for Sri Lanka
Asian Games competitors for Sri Lanka
Commonwealth Games competitors for Sri Lanka
People from Southern Province, Sri Lanka
South Asian Games medalists in athletics
20th-century Sri Lankan people
21st-century Sri Lankan people